Ocosta Junior Senior High School, commonly known as Ocosta or Ocosta High School, is a public junior and senior high school located in Westport, Washington, and is part of the Ocosta School District. The high school mascot is the Wildcat. The school teaches grades 7–12.

High schools in Grays Harbor County, Washington
Public high schools in Washington (state)